The Lake Charles Historic District in Lake Charles, Louisiana was listed on the National Register of Historic Places in 1990.  It is locally designated as the Charpentier Historic District.  The NRHP district is roughly bounded by Iris, Hodges, Lawrence, Kirkman, S. Division and Louisiana.

It also includes the 1896-built Church of the Good Shepherd, which was separately listed on the NRHP in 1983. Relevant architectural styles inside the district are Colonial Revival, Bungalow/craftsman, Queen Anne Revival and Eastlake.

It was deemed "locally significant in the areas of industry and architecture. It is all that is left to represent the lumber boom prosperity of Lake Charles in the late-nineteenth and early-twentieth centuries. It is architecturally significant as an outstanding collection of historic buildings within the context of southwestern Louisiana. It shares this distinction with two other towns, Crowley and Jennings, and in some respects is superior to both."

See also 
National Register of Historic Places listings in Calcasieu Parish, Louisiana
Lake Charles, Louisiana

References

National Register of Historic Places in Louisiana
Colonial Revival architecture in Louisiana
Buildings and structures completed in 1880
Calcasieu Parish, Louisiana
Historic districts on the National Register of Historic Places in Louisiana